Television's Greatest Hits - 65 More TV Themes From The 50s & 60s is the second volume of the Television's Greatest Hits series of compilation albums by TVT Records. 

According to Allmusic, "There are 65 television themes here, and apart from the little mistakes, they're almost all interesting. Among the strangest material here is the music from some of television's failures, such as It's About Time (one of the longest theme songs ever done for TV) and The Green Hornet. Also pleasing is the fact that the producers have used opening and closing theme versions of this material grafted together, so we hear the fullest possible versions of the themes from Ben Casey."

The album catalog was later acquired by The Bicycle Music Company. In September 2011, Los Angeles-based Oglio Records announced they were releasing the  Television's Greatest Hits song catalog after entering into an arrangement The Bicycle Music Company. A series of 9 initial "6-packs" including some of the songs from the album has been announced for 2011.

Track listing 
NOTE: An asterisk (*) donates a track that was re-recorded for the album.
The Three Stooges*
Merrie Melodies ("Merrily We Roll Along")*
The Rocky and Bullwinkle Show
Huckleberry Hound
Mighty Mouse Playhouse
Courageous Cat and Minute Mouse*
The Pink Panther Show*
The Road Runner Show*
George of the Jungle
Jonny Quest
Spider-Man
Underdog*
Looney Tunes ("The Merry-Go-Round Broke Down")*
Peanuts ("Linus and Lucy")*
Mister Rogers' Neighborhood ("Won't You Be My Neighbor?")
The Odd Couple
The Courtship of Eddie's Father ("My Best Friend")
The Mary Tyler Moore Show ("Love Is All Around")
Gidget
That Girl
Bewitched*
Love, American Style
The Honeymooners ("You're My Greatest Love")
I Married Joan*
The Monkees
The Brady Bunch
The Partridge Family ("Come On Get Happy")
My Mother the Car*
Car 54, Where Are You?
It's About Time*
My Favorite Martian
Jeopardy! ("Think Music")
Hogan's Heroes
Gomer Pyle, U.S.M.C.
The Rat Patrol
12 O'Clock High
The Time Tunnel
Voyage To the Bottom of the Sea
Seahunt*
Daktari*
Tarzan
The Adventures of Robin Hood
Rawhide
Bat Masterson*
Maverick*
Wagon Train
Have Gun – Will Travel ("The Ballad of Paladin")*
The Virginian*
The Rebel
Peter Gunn*
Route 66*
I Spy
The Avengers*
The Saint*
Hawaiian Eye*
The Green Hornet
The Outer Limits
Dark Shadows
Ben Casey
Medical Center*
NBC Mystery Movie*
ABC's Wide World of Sports
The Jackie Gleason Show ("Melancholy Serenade")*
The Smothers Brothers Comedy Hour
Monty Python's Flying Circus

Credits
Steven Gottlieb - Executive Producer

Reception
Alongside Television's Greatest Hits Volume I, the compilation was described by CD Review as "organized as a theoretical average viewing day". CD Review jokingly commented that the compilation would be "highly effective during interrogations" by the FBI.

References

External links
Television's Greatest Hits at Oglio Records

TVT Records compilation albums
1986 compilation albums
Television's Greatest Hits albums